The 2000 Gold Flake Open was an ATP tournament held in Chennai, India. The tournament was held from 3 to 10 January.

Finals

Singles

 Jérôme Golmard defeated  Markus Hantschk 6–3, 6–7(6–8), 6–3
 It was Golmard's only title of the year and the 2nd of his career.

Doubles

 Julien Boutter /  Christophe Rochus defeated  Prahlad Srinath /  Saurav Panja 7–5, 6–1
 It was Boutter's 1st title of the year and the 1st of his career. It was Rochus's only title of the year and the 1st of his career.

References

 
Chennai Open
Chennai Open
Chennai Open